A list of films produced in Hong Kong in 2009:.

January–March

April–June

July–September

October–December

Unknown release date

External links
 IMDB list of Hong Kong films
 Hong Kong films of 2009 at HKcinemamagic.com

2009
Films
Hong Kong